Nabab is a 2017 Indo-Bangladesh film.

Nabab may also refer to:

 Nabab Nandini (film), a 2007 Indian Bengali film
 Nabab LLB, a 2020 Bangladeshi film
 Le nabab, an 1853 opéra comique by Fromental Halévy
 Livio Nabab (born 1988), Guadeloupe football player

See also
 Nabob (disambiguation)